The Amazing Race Australia 5 is the fifth season of the Australian reality television game show The Amazing Race Australia, an Australian spin-off of the American series The Amazing Race, and the second instalment of Network 10's iteration of the show. The season featured sixteen teams of two in a pre-existing relationship in a race around Australia, due to the COVID-19 pandemic, to win .

The fifth edition of the show premiered at 7:30 pm on 1 February 2021. Beau Ryan, former rugby league footballer, returned to host for his second season of the show.

Cowboys Brendon Crawley and Jackson Dening were the winners of this season.

Production

Development and filming

On 10 October 2019, the show's renewal was announced at the 2020 upfronts prior to the premiere of the previous season with the second season from Network 10 initially set to air in late 2020.

After production of the thirty-third season of the American edition of The Amazing Race was halted in February 2020 due to the COVID-19 pandemic, questions were raised over whether a new Australian edition would be filmed later in the year. A Network 10 spokesperson later stated that the network was seeking advice to create a safe route and establish proper safety measures. Host Beau Ryan then stated on The Kyle and Jackie O Show that the season would not be cancelled, but the outbreak had caused producers to change the season's route twice and that the season could film only in Australia if the outbreak worsened. The initially planned international route for this season included visits to India, Brazil and Europe. On 11 March, a Network 10 spokesperson confirmed that the season would film only in Australia. Filming was set to occur between June and July 2020 but was postponed due to interstate travel restrictions. Beverley McGarvey, the chief content officer and executive vice president of ViacomCBS in Australia and New Zealand, stated that the network was committed to filming the season once state borders reopened. In an interview on Studio 10, Beau Ryan stated that the show created COVID safety officers, contestants and crew members would be regularly tested and provided with personal protective equipment, and the show would be travelling to areas with lower populations to reduce personal interactions.

According to Beau Ryan, production would take place over eight to nine weeks starting in late September with a two-week quarantine before filming, and Victoria and Western Australia would be hard to include due to border and lockdown restrictions. The planned legs in Western Australia were to be Perth, Rottnest Island and Broome would eventually be cancelled and replaced by reused legs in Queensland as an alternate location, although these places were eventually to be visited in the following series. Following the quarantine period to medically clear the teams and production, filming started in Queensland in early October 2020. During filming, producer Yasmin Kara broke her vertebrae while testing a challenge that involved jumping into the water. Production concluded in mid-November.

Notable Pit Stop greeters for this season included Olympic swimmer Emily Seebohm in Leg 2, comedy duo the Crackup Sisters in Leg 3, drift car racer Justin Gill in Leg 7, the 'world's loudest burper' Neville Sharp in Leg 8, touch rugby player Bo de la Cruz in Leg 15, Lady Nelson ship master Malcolm Riley in Leg 16, mountaineer Greg Mortimer in Leg 20, Mad Max Museum founder Adrian Bennett in Leg 22 and original Yellow Wiggle Greg Page in Leg 23.

At 24 legs, this season is the longest in Amazing Race history. Chris & Aleisha set a record for most consecutive legs run in a single season at 22 legs. With eight leg wins, Ashleigh & Amanda broke the record for most leg wins by an all-female team, previously held by Natalie & Meaghan from The Amazing Race Canada 2, and tied the record for most leg wins in a single season.

This season's visits to Tasmania and Australian Capital Territory meant that all 8 of Australia's states and territories were featured at least once in all five seasons of The Amazing Race Australia.

Format changes
This season introduced two new game mechanics: the First Class Pass and Stowaway teams.
The First Class Pass was awarded to the first-place team of a non-elimination leg. The recipients would be able to skip the next leg, during which they would enjoy a special reward experience. Additionally, the holders would allocate The Salvage (an advantage) and The Sabotage (a disadvantage) to the bottom two teams of the non-elimination leg (this replaced the Speed Bump non-elimination given to the last placing team).
At random intervals, new teams would be introduced at the start of specific legs. These teams would be referred to as Stowaway Teams.

Additionally, unlike other versions of The Amazing Race and previous seasons of The Amazing Race Australia, the first team to arrive at a U-Turn was required to use it (in other versions, this decision was optional for all teams, unless it was used by a team who arrived earlier).

A new twist called the T-Junction was announced in pre-season press but did not appear on this season. The T-Junction is similar to an Intersection, but with all remaining teams split up into two larger super-teams together for the rest of the leg. The first team to arrive at the T-Junction would create both super-teams. The second super-team to arrive at the Pit Stop would then have to choose one team from the group to eliminate.

Casting
Casting for the fifth season of The Amazing Race Australia initially opened during the finale week of the previous season on 2 December 2019. As the number of coronavirus cases began to decline across much of the country and some states started the process of reopening borders, casting resumed on 16 June 2020. Casting was initially set to close on 26 July 2020 but was extended to 2 August 2020.

30,000 people applied for this season. Ultimately only 16 teams were chosen to compete – 14 teams began racing from the first leg with two additional "stowaway teams" entering the competition in the seventh & tenth legs. At 16 teams, this season set the record for the most teams running a season of The Amazing Race.

Marketing
Telstra, Bundaberg Brewed Drinks, Subway and Disney+ served as sponsors for this season.

Cast
The cast included actress Aleisha Rose, Dancing with the Stars professional dancer Violeta Mugica, footballers Marijana "MJ" Rajčić and Chelsea Randall and professional bodybuilders Stan Turek and Wayne Marino.

Results
The following teams participated in the season, each listed along with their placements in each leg. This table may not necessarily be reflective of all content broadcast on the program, owing to the inclusion or exclusion of some data. Placements are listed in finishing order.

A  placement indicates that the team was eliminated. 
An  placement indicates that the team was the last to arrive at a pit stop in a non-elimination leg.
 An italicized and underlined placement indicates that the team was the last to arrive at a pit stop, but there was no rest period at the pit stop and all teams were instructed to continue racing.
 A  indicates that the team won the Fast Forward. 
 A  indicates that the team used the U-Turn and a  indicates the team on the receiving end of the U-Turn.
A  indicates the team won the First Class Pass in the previous leg.
A  indicates that the teams encountered an Intersection.
A  indicates the team used the Salvage advantage.
A  indicates that the team received the Sabotage penalty.

Notes

 This team was eliminated.
 This team arrived last at the pit stop in a non-elimination leg.
 This team chose to withdraw from the competition.
 This team won the First Class Pass from the previous leg to skip this particular leg.
 This team used a Salvage Advantage in this particular leg.
 This team received a Sabotage Penalty in this particular leg.
 Shane & Deb chose to use the U-Turn on Holly & Dolor.
 This leg featured an Intersection:
The ninth leg had teams were paired up thusly: Ashleigh & Amanda, Chris & Aleisha, Skye-Blue & Jake and Holly & Dolor, and Jordan & Violeta, Brendon & Jackson, Dwes & Katherine and Jaskirat & Anurag.
The twelfth leg had teams were paired up thusly: Ashleigh & Amanda and Holly & Dolor, Chris & Aleisha and Stan & Wayne, Brendon & Jackson and Jaskirat & Anurag, and Skye-Blue & Jake and Jordan & Violeta.
The fourteenth leg had teams were paired up thusly: Brendon & Jackson and Ashleigh & Amanda, Jaskirat & Anurag and Skye-Blue & Jake, Holly & Dolor and Chris & Aleisha, and MJ & Chelsea and Stan & Wayne.
The seventeenth leg had teams were paired up thusly: Ashleigh & Amanda and Skye-Blue & Jake, MJ & Chelsea and Jaskirat & Anurag, and Chris & Aleisha and Brendon & Jackson.
 This team arrived last at the pit stop, but they were instructed to continue racing.
 This team won the Fast Forward in this particular leg.
 Jaskirat & Anurag chose to use the U-Turn on MJ & Chelsea.
 Brendon & Jackson chose to use the U-Turn on Chris & Aleisha.
 Jobelle & Rani initially arrived 11th but were issued a 30-minute penalty for failing to complete the "Bombs Away" task. Malaan & Tina and Brendon & Jackson checked in during their penalty time, dropping them to 13th.
 Alex & Jack elected to withdraw from the show before the second leg, citing mental health reasons. Dwes & Katherine returned to the competition at Longreach Airport to replace Alex & Jack in Leg 3.
 Jude & Shannon initially arrived 11th, but were forced to backtrack to retrieve their backpacks. Holly & Dolor checked in during this time, dropping them to 12th. 
 Malaan & Tina initially arrived 8th but were issued a 10-minute penalty for breaking a puzzle piece during the dinosaur jigsaw task. Three teams (Chris & Aleisha, Dwes & Katherine and Jordan & Violeta) checked in during their penalty time, dropping them to 11th.
 Dwes & Katherine initially arrived 9th but were issued with a 10-minute penalty for hitching a ride on a private car. Holly & Dolor checking in during this time, dropping them to 10th.
 Shane & Deb were medically removed from the competition during the overnight rest on Leg 5 due to Shane injuring his knee during the leg's first Roadblock at Horseshoe Bay.
 Violeta timed out of the second Roadblock and was given the next clue without completing the task. Jordan & Violeta subsequently checked into the Pit Stop last, but were notified that the leg was a non-elimination leg. The 1-hour penalty they incurred from the Roadblock would be instead applied at the starting time at Leg 6.
 Jobelle & Rani failed to obtain a bottle during the "Treasure Hunt" challenge on Green Island and elected to take a penalty. As they arrived last to the Pit Stop, they were eliminated without the penalty being applied.
 The Roadblocks in Legs 6 & 17 were unaired. According to an Instagram Story from Chris, Aleisha and Jaskirat performed both Roadblocks.
 MJ & Chelsea entered the competition at Darwin Airport in Leg 7 and started racing 5 minutes after the other teams left the airport. 
 Sefa & Jessica were unable to complete the "Goldfish Bowl" challenge at Hidden Valley Raceway due to the challenge site closing. They were directed to proceed to the Pit Stop. As they already arrived last, they were eliminated without a penalty.
 Dwes & Katherine initially arrived 6th but were issued a 30-minute penalty as Katherine quit the Roadblock. Three teams (Brendon & Jackson, Skye-Blue & Jake and Jaskirat & Anurag) checked in during their penalty time, dropping them to last place. However, they were notified that the leg was a non-elimination leg and the remainder of their penalty would be applied at the starting time at Leg 9.
 The Roadblock in Leg 9 was cancelled after the hot air balloons carrying the teams crashed off-course. The task was then converted into an Intersection where both team members competed. As this task was cancelled, this is not reflected in the Roadblock count. 
 Stan & Wayne entered the competition on Leg 10 at the Manguri Siding and started racing after the other teams left the train.
 Chris & Aleisha initially arrived 7th but were issued a 20-minute penalty for timing out of the challenge at the Adelaide Oval. Stan & Wayne checked in during their penalty time, dropping Chris & Aleisha to 8th.
 MJ & Chelsea initially arrived 5th, but missed the second Detour having arrived at the Pit Stop by chance. They were forced to backtrack to complete the Detour before they could check in. Chris & Aleisha and Holly & Dolor checked in during this time, dropping MJ & Chelsea to 7th.
 Stan & Wayne were unable to attempt the Detour due to both challenge sites closing. They were directed to proceed to the Pit Stop, where they were informed it was a non-elimination leg.
 Chris & Aleisha and Brendon & Jackson did not complete the Intersection. As they arrived at the Pit Stop in the bottom two of a non-elimination leg, they were told that their time penalty was voided.

Prizes
The prize for each leg, with the exception of Leg 20, was awarded to the first place team for that leg. The prizes were:
Leg 1 – A holiday to Cairns and the Great Barrier Reef with accommodation at the Daintree Ecolodge courtesy of Tourism Tropical North Queensland.
Leg 2 – The First Class Pass, which included a luxury experience at the Saltbush Retreat in Longreach to be enjoyed while the remaining teams race in Leg 3.
Leg 3 – A family holiday at the Sea World Resort on the Gold Coast, with unlimited entry to Sea World, as well as the Warner Bros. Movie World & Wet'n'Wild Gold Coast courtesy of Nickelodeon.
Leg 4 – An island getaway at the Orpheus Island Lodge, Palm Island.
Leg 5 – The First Class Pass, which included a luxury experience on a yacht to be enjoyed while the remaining teams race in Leg 6.
Leg 6 – A holiday to the Disneyland Resort in Anaheim, California, United States courtesy of Disney+.
Leg 7 – A five-night harbourside holiday to Darwin, Northern Territory with a Top End Safari Camp overnight tour courtesy of Tourism Northern Territory.
Leg 8 – The First Class Pass, which included a helicopter ride and picnic in Alice Springs to be enjoyed while the remaining teams race in Leg 9.
Leg 9 – A holiday to Uluru with accommodation at Sails in the Desert and a Sounds of Silence dinner courtesy of Voyages.
Leg 10 – A$5000 for each racer.
Leg 11 – The First Class Pass, which included a spa day to be enjoyed while the remaining teams race in Leg 12.
Leg 12 – A holiday to Hayman Island with accommodation at Daydream Island Resort courtesy of 10 Travlr.
Leg 13 – A holiday to Fiji with accommodation at Hilton Fiji Beach Resort and Spa courtesy of 10 Travlr and Hilton Hotels & Resorts.
Leg 14 – The First Class Pass, which included a luxurious penthouse at the Emporium Hotel in South Bank, Brisbane and massages to be enjoyed while the remaining teams race in Leg 15.
Leg 15 – A holiday on The Ghan courtesy of Journey Beyond.
Leg 16 – A$5,000 and free Subway for a year for each racer.
Leg 17 – The First Class Pass, which included golfing at the Country Club Tasmania in Launceston, Tasmania to be enjoyed while the remaining teams raced in Leg 18.
Leg 18 – A holiday to Cairns in a Horizon Suite at the Shangri-La Hotel courtesy of 10 Travlr and Shangri-La Hotels and Resorts.
Leg 19 – A QT Sydney and QT Bondi hotel package courtesy of 10 Travlr and QT Hotels & Resorts.
Leg 21 – A video call home and a 5G Connection Package worth A$5000 courtesy of Telstra.
Leg 22 – A holiday to Cairns in a Horizon Suite at the Shangri-La Hotel courtesy of 10 Travlr and Shangri-La Hotels and Resorts.
Leg 23 – A holiday to New Zealand, including return tickets and stays at QT Auckland, QT Wellington and QT Queenstown courtesy of 10 Travlr and QT Hotels & Resorts.
Leg 24 – A$250,000

Salvage and Sabotage
Replacing the Speed Bump as the non-elimination game mechanic is the Salvage and the Sabotage. On a non-elimination leg, the leg winners (who will also win a First Class Pass) will delegate between the bottom two teams the Salvage (to assist the team), and the Sabotage (to penalise the team). The Salvages and Sabotages for each non-elimination leg are as follows:

Notes

Race summary

Leg 1 (Queensland)

Airdate: 1 February 2021
Newell, Queensland, Australia (Newell Beach) (Starting Line)
Mossman (Drumsara Station)
 Mossman (Exchange Hotel)
Mossman (Mossman Sugar Mill)
Mossman (Mossman River)
Mossman (Daintree Rainforest) 

This season's first Detour was a choice between Food or Bev. In Food, teams had to properly peel  of prawns to receive their next clue. In Bev, both team members had to deliver a tray of seven schooners of beer without spilling them past a red line to receive their next clue from the publican.

Additional tasks
From Newell Beach, teams had to decide whether to run  up the beach or travel by boat  upriver in a slow tinny to find a car that would serve as their transportation for this leg. As only seven cars are available at the end of each route, and seven tinnies available on the river, only seven teams could take each option. 
At Drumsara Station, one team member had to don a classic flight suit and swing in the air to toss four balls thrown to them by their partner into a target, referencing the air raid on Mossman during World War II, within five minutes before retrieving their next clue. Only four teams could complete this task at a time.
At Mossman Sugar Mill, teams had to find a pair of tongs in a pile a cut sugarcane and a sugar cube in a pile of raw sugar. Then, teams had to drop the sugar cube into a large tea cup to receive their next clue.
At the Mossman River, teams had to catch 20 cane toads by hand and place them in a box to receive their next clue.

Additional note
Before the competition began, teams experienced a Welcome to Country ceremony from the Kuku Yalanji.

Leg 2 (Queensland)

Airdate: 2 February 2021
Cairns (Cairns City Library) (Pit Start)
 Cairns (Cairns Airport) to Gold Coast (Gold Coast Airport) or Brisbane (Brisbane Airport) (Unaired)
Gold Coast (Coolangatta – North Kirra SLSC)
 Gold Coast (Southport – Gold Coast Aquatic Centre or Miami – UGG Since 1974)
 Gold Coast (Arundel – Mike Hatcher Junior Motorcycle Club)
Gold Coast (Southport – Telstra 5G Innovation Centre)
 (G:link) Gold Coast (Southport – Southport Light Rail Station to Helensvale – Helensvale Railway Station)
Gold Coast (Oxenford – Wet'n'Wild Gold Coast) 

This leg's Detour was a choice between Swim to the Beat or Snappy Feet. In Swim to the Beat, teams had to learn and perform a synchronised swimming routine with the Gold Coast Mermaids to the satisfaction of the Olympic coach to receive their next clue. In Snappy Feet, teams had to select a pair of ugg boots from a display of over a thousand pairs and stick a hand into one boot each until they found a "golden surprise", a gold mousetrap (hidden among boots with normal mousetraps), to receive their next clue.

In this season's first Roadblock, one team member had to complete one lap around a motocross course on a dirt bike in under 55 seconds to receive their next clue.

Additional tasks
At North Kirra SLSC, one team member had to learn a series of flag commands to direct their partner, who had taken an inflatable rescue boat offshore to a series of buoys, to three allocated buoys. After retrieving an Amazing Race flag from each correct buoy, teams would receive their next clue.
At Telstra 5G Innovation Centre, teams had to search for the location of their next Pit Stop, which was displayed was on an electronic billboard outside of the building.
At Wet'n'Wild Gold Coast, teams had to ride the AquaLoop before checking into the Pit Stop.

Leg 3 (Queensland)

Airdate: 3 February 2021
Gold Coast (Broadbeach – Gold Coast Bulletin Centenary Park) (Pit Start)
 (Airtrain) Brisbane (Domestic Terminal Railway Station) (Unaired)
 Brisbane (Brisbane Airport) to Longreach (Longreach Airport)
Winton (North Gregory Hotel)
Winton (Australian Age of Dinosaurs)
Winton (Winton Truck Museum) (Overnight Rest)
 Longreach (Camden Park Station or Longreach Solar Farm)
Longreach (Australian Stockman's Hall of Fame) 

This leg's Detour was a choice between Pick or Polish. In Pick, teams had clean three freshly-shorn fleece and roll a bale of wool to a farmer to receive their next clue. In Polish, teams had to clean 42 solar panels to receive their next clue.

Additional tasks
Outside the North Gregory Hotel, teams participated in the local Dunny Derby. Teams had to pull a local in a mobile dunny around a racetrack while one team member balanced a bedpan full of dunny water. After completing a lap, teams had to pour the remaining water into a bucket and repeat the derby until they filled the bucket to a red line to receive their next clue from derby coordinator Robyn Stephens.
At the Australian Age of Dinosaurs, teams had to search a marked area to find 33 puzzle pieces and assemble them to form a dinosaur skeleton to receive their next clue from a paleontologist. If teams broke any bones, they would receive a time penalty at the Pit Stop.
At the Winton Truck Museum, teams had to sign up for one of 11 departure times, five minutes apart starting from 7:00 a.m. the following morning. In the morning, teams had to fit two  tyres onto a road train to receive their next clue and Bundaberg Brewed Drinks.

Additional note
At the Longreach Airport, teams experienced a Welcome to Country ceremony from the Iningai. Teams were then greeted by Beau, who announced that Dwes & Katherine would be reentering the competition to replace Alex & Jack. Teams then left the airport in their marked cars to drive to the town of Winton in the order they arrived at the previous Pit Stop.

Leg 4 (Queensland)

Airdate: 7 February 2021
 Longreach (Longreach Airport) to Townsville (Townsville Airport) (Pit Start)
Townsville (Castle Hill) 
Townsville (Townsville Airport – Hinterland Aviation Office) (Overnight Rest)
 Townsville (Townsville Airport) to Palm Island (Palm Island Airport)
Palm Island (Story Tree)
 Palm Island (Esplanade – Fred Clay Freedom Park)
 Palm Island (Bwgcolman Radio or Sunset Snack Bar)
 Palm Island (Palm Island Airport Runway) 
 Palm Island (St Michael's Catholic Primary School) 

In this leg's Roadblock, one team member had to abseil  down Castle Hill at night and hook their team picture to a "Brawn" or "Brains" board, which would impact teams during Leg 13, before receiving their next clue.

This leg's Detour was a choice between On Air or On Time. In On Air, teams had to memorise and perfectly deliver a Bwgcolman Radio advert in under 25 seconds to receive their next clue. In On Time, teams had to prepare a pizza named after a National Rugby League team and deliver it to a home flying the team's flag to receive their next clue.

Additional tasks
At the Hinterland Aviation office, teams had to sign up for one of five charter flights departing the following morning to Palm Island. The first (8:00 am), third (8:45 am) and fifth (10:15 am) flights carried three teams, the second flight (8:30 am) carried one team and the fourth flight (9:30 am) carried two teams.
At the Story Tree, teams received a Welcome to Country ceremony from Manbarra and Bwgcolman Elders before retrieving their next clue.
At Fred Clay Freedom Park, teams had to choose a necklace – red for men and yellow for women. The symbol on the necklace would determine which traditional Imbala dance teams had to learn and correctly perform to receive their next clue.
At the Palm Island Airport Runway, teams had to cut a  patch of grass below the guide string using tiny scissors to receive their next clue from the ground control staff member.

Additional note
During the Pit Stop, all teams flew from Longreach to Townsville and began the fourth leg at Townsville Airport.

Leg 5 (Queensland)

Airdate: 8 February 2021
 Palm Island (Palm Island Jetty) to Nelly Bay, Magnetic Island (Nelly Bay Ferry Terminal) (Pit Start)
Nelly Bay (Isle Hire Car Rentals)
 Horseshoe Bay (Horseshoe Bay)
Horseshoe Bay (Bungalow Bay Koala Village) (Overnight Rest)
Nelly Bay (Scallywags Cafe)
Horseshoe Bay (Magnetic Island Magpies Junior AFL Club)  (Unaired)
 Picnic Bay (Picnic Bay)
Picnic Bay (Picnic Bay Jetty) 

In this leg's first Roadblock, teams had to drive to Horseshoe Bay and find Beau Ryan. Once everyone arrived, one team member had to hang onto a pole above the water. Teams would depart the next day based on how long racers held onto the pole.

This leg had an unaired Detour that was a choice between crab racing or bogan games.

In this leg's second Roadblock, one team member, regardless of who performed the previous Roadblock, had to learn to fire breathe and light three targets to receive their next clue.

Additional tasks
At the Isle Hire Car Rentals, teams had to find their next clue along with a car, which would serve as their transportation for this leg.
At Scallywags Cafe, teams had to eat 20 dry Weet-Bix bars to receive their next clue.

Additional note
During the Pit Stop, teams travelled by ferry to Magnetic Island and started the fifth leg at the ferry terminal.

Leg 6 (Queensland)

Airdate: 9 February 2021
Nelly Bay (Magnetic Island Marina) (Pit Start)
 Nelly Bay (Nelly Bay Ferry Terminal) to Townsville (Port of Townsville)
 Townsville (Townsville Airport) to Cairns (Cairns Airport)
 Cairns (Reef Fleet Terminal) to Fitzroy Island (Fitzroy Island Jetty)
 Fitzroy Island (Great Barrier Reef or Cairns Turtle Rehabilitation Centre)
 Fitzroy Island (Fitzroy Island Jetty) to Green Island 
Green Island (Sandy Crack Beach) 

This leg's Detour was a choice between Restoration or Rehabilitation. In Restoration, teams had to dive underwater in a Scuba-Doo and correctly count the coral on two coral trees (109) to receive their next clue. In Rehabilitation, teams had to clean the sea turtle tank filters and feed a sea turtle 30 deboned squid and five fish to receive their next clue. This Detour had a limit of five teams.

There was an unaired Roadblock on this leg as teams were shown holding a Roadblock clue after the treasure hunt task.

Additional tasks
After the Detour, teams had to sign up for one of two boats, the first carried five teams and the second carried four teams, to Green Island.
On Green Island, teams had to use a treasure map to find five hidden bottles, arrange the words inside the bottles to form the message "Take Bottles to Recycling Plant" and bring the bottles to the recycling plant to receive their next clue.

Additional notes
Teams travelled together on the same ferry to Townsville and same flight to Cairns. Then teams travelled via ferry to Fitzroy Island on one of two ferries, the first of which carried five teams and the second carried four teams.
Jordan & Violeta were required to temporarily remove their goggles and snorkel that they had to wear as their Sabotage disadvantage to complete the "Rehabilitation" Detour, to avoid scaring the turtles.

Leg 7 (Queensland → Northern Territory)

Airdate: 14 February 2021
 Cairns (Cairns Airport) to Darwin, Northern Territory (Darwin International Airport) (Pit Start)
Darwin (The Gardens – Mindil Beach)
Darwin (Berrimah – Crocodylus Park)
 Darwin (Eaton – Royal Flying Doctor Service Hangar or Stuart Park – Laksa House)
 Girraween (Girraween Lagoon)
Darwin (Hidden Valley – Hidden Valley Raceway) 

This leg's Detour was a choice between Treat It or Eat It. In Treat It, teams had to properly treat a patient for a burn, a head trauma and a snake bite to receive their next clue from a flight nurse. In Eat It, teams had to properly make a bowl of laksa to receive their next clue from Amye Un.

In this leg's Roadblock, one team member had to swim in a freshwater crocodile-inhabited billabong, which was used as a filming location for Crocodile Dundee, to a pontoon, grab a throwing knife, swim back to shore and toss it into a target to receive their next clue.

Additional tasks
At Crocodylus Park, teams had to carry a saltwater crocodile  to a new pen, measure it and release it into a lagoon to receive their next clue from a ranger.
At Hidden Valley Raceway, both team members had to ride in a drift car and keep the water in a fishbowl from spilling past a red line to receive their next clue.

Additional notes
During the Pit Stop, all teams flew from Cairns to Darwin and were greeted outside the airport by Beau, who introduced stowaway team MJ & Chelsea to the competition. Teams were then sent to grab their clue from a car in the carpark with the stowaway team having to wait five minutes before they could leave.
Teams received a Welcome to Country saltwater ceremony from Larrakia Elders and Amazing Race Australia 4 finalists Jasmin & Jerome on Mindil Beach.

Leg 8 (Northern Territory)

Airdate: 15 February 2021
Darwin (Civic Park) (Pit Start)
 Darwin (Chung Wah Society Temple or Lazy Susan's Eating House)
 Darwin (Darwin HUET Training Centre)
Lambells Lagoon (Pudakul Aboriginal Cultural Tours) (Unaired)
Humpty Doo (Humpty Doo Barramundi Farm)
Humpty Doo (Anzac Parade – Nev's Place) 

This leg's Detour was a choice between Stomp or Chomp. In Stomp, teams had to learn and perform a traditional Chinese lion dance to the satisfaction of the head lion trainer to receive their next clue. In Chomp, teams had to eat a  steamed barramundi using only chopsticks to receive their next clue.

In this leg's Roadblock, one team member had to complete a helicopter crash training exercise by escaping from a helicopter simulator that was submerged and inverted in a pool of water while blindfolded to receive their next clue.

Additional tasks
At Pudakul Aboriginal Cultural Tours, teams had to cut off part of a tree and strip the bark to make traditional Limilngan-Wulna clapsticks to receive their next clue. This task went unaired in the episode but was shown as an extra scene on the show's website.
At Humpty Doo Barramundi Farm, teams had to catch one barramundi by hand to receive their next clue.

Leg 9 (Northern Territory)

Airdate: 16 February 2021
Darwin (Bicentennial Park) (Pit Start)
 Darwin (Darwin International Airport) to Alice Springs (Alice Springs Airport)
Alice Springs (Alice Springs Library Bus Stop) (Overnight Rest)
  Alice Springs (Outback Ballooning) 
 Alice Springs (Alice Springs Library Bus Stop)
Alice Springs (Alice Springs Telegraph Station)
Alice Springs (Todd River)
Alice Springs (Outback Cycling) (Unaired)
 Alice Springs (Alice Springs Skate Park or Pyndan Camel Tracks)
Alice Springs (Alice Springs Telegraph Station) (Unaired)
Alice Springs (Alice Springs Train Station – The Ghan) 

In this leg's Roadblock, one team member had to drop coloured bombs from a hot air balloon onto three targets. Due to high wind conditions, this task was cancelled and changed to an Intersection. The four teams from each balloon had to join up to pack their balloon and receive their next clue. Teams were then no longer Intersected.

This leg's Detour was a choice between Build or Bathe. In Build, teams had to build either a grind box, a quarter pipe or a table top ramp to receive their next clue from professional skateboarder Nicky Hayes. In Bathe, teams had to wash, dry and groom an Australian feral camel before feeding it a carrot to receive their next clue.

Additional tasks
At Alice Springs Library Bus Stop, teams had to sign up for one of two buses departing the next morning at 4:00 a.m. and carrying four teams each.
At Todd River, teams had to complete the Henley-on-Todd Regatta by carrying a land boat, normally carried by six people, around a  course while avoiding pirates to receive their next clue.
At Outback Cycling, teams did a task involving digging with a shovel to propel themselves on a small cart, which went unaired.
After the Detour, teams had to decipher a Morse code message that would reveal the name of their next Pit Stop – "Ghan Station" – to receive their next clue and Subway sandwiches, which went unaired.

Leg 10 (Northern Territory → South Australia)

Airdate: 21 February 2021
 (The Ghan) Alice Springs (Alice Springs Train Station) to Mount Clarence Station, South Australia (Manguri Siding)
 Coober Pedy (Tom's Working Opal Mine or Old Timers Mine)
Coober Pedy (Saint Elijah's Underground Church)
 Coober Pedy (Coober Pedy Sign)
Coober Pedy (Coober Pedy Opal Fields Golf Club)
Coober Pedy (Crocodile Harry's Underground Nest) 

This leg's Detour was a choice between Above or Below. In Above, teams had to load 100 buckets of mullock into an opal noodler to receive their next clue from explosives technician Georgie. In Below, teams had to descend  into a dark opal mine and find an opal using only a blacklight torch before finding their own way out through a secret passage, which connected to the underground Comfort Inn hotel, where they would receive their next clue from receptionist Mel.

In this leg's Roadblock, one team member had to paint the left half of the next letter of the Coober Pedy sign yellow and the right half red to receive their next clue.

Additional tasks
On The Ghan, teams were shown a video message from Beau informing them that they were now locked in a cabin on the train and had to escape from their cabin. The order teams escaped would be the order they left the train.
At Saint Elijah's Underground Church, teams had two minutes to maneuver four small mirrors to reflect a laser beam onto a large opal and receive their next clue. If they were unsuccessful, they had to go to the back of the queue and wait for another attempt.
At Coober Pedy Opal Fields Golf Club, one team member had to hit a hole in one by hitting a golf ball into a hole held by their partner to receive their next clue. Teams could catch other teams' balls.

Additional note
At Mount Clarence Station, teams were greeted by Beau, who introduced the next stowaway team Stan & Wayne to the competition. Stan & Wayne started the leg in last place, following the departure of the other teams, who departed in the order of completion of the escape cabin task.

Leg 11 (South Australia)

Airdate: 22 February 2021
 (The Ghan) Mount Clarence Station (Manguri Siding) to Adelaide (Adelaide Parklands Terminal) (Pit Start)
Adelaide (Adelaide Oval)
 Hahndorf (Hahndorf Inn)
 Adelaide (Amazing Grace Gospel Church)
Adelaide (Trinity Church) 

This leg's Detour was a choice between Slap or Snag. In Slap, teams had to don lederhosen and then learn and correctly perform a traditional Bavarian Schuhplattler dance to receive their next clue. In Snag, teams had to eat a German Wurstplatte of bratwurst, frankfurters and pretzels to receive their next clue.

In this leg's Roadblock, one team member had to learn a song in Swahili and perform with the Amazing Grace Gospel Church choir to receive their next clue.

Additional task
At the Adelaide Oval, one team member had to climb to the roof and use a map to direct their partner to find their team picture hidden among the stadium's 50,000 seats to receive their next clue. If they were unsuccessful after 10 minutes, they had to go to the back of the queue and wait for another attempt.

Additional note
During the Pit Stop, teams travelled on The Ghan to Adelaide to begin the eleventh leg.

Leg 12 (South Australia)

Airdate: 23 February 2021
Adelaide (Rundle Mall) (Pit Start)
 Adelaide (Adelaide Airport) to Port Lincoln (Port Lincoln Airport)
Port Lincoln (Port Lincoln Marina – Fishermen's Memorial)
 Port Lincoln (Port Lincoln Foreshore or Croatian Sporting Club)
Port Lincoln (Port Lincoln Marina)  (Overnight Rest)
 Memory Cove Wilderness Protection Area (Hopkins Island)
Lincoln National Park (Sleaford-Wanna Sand Dunes)
Lincoln National Park (Boston Bay) 

This leg's Detour was a choice between Toss or Roll. In Toss, teams had to participate in the Tunarama Tuna Toss and toss a  rubber tuna into three rings on first impact to receive their next clue. In Roll, teams had to win 10 games of bocce by rolling their ball closer to a jack than their competitors to receive their next clue. Every time teams lost, both team members had to don cravattas.

Additional tasks
At Port Lincoln Marina, teams encountered an Intersection, where they had to pair up and then sign up for one of two boats departing 15 minutes apart and carrying four teams each to Hopkins Island. There, teams had to attach a buoy to a rope and chain then swim down  to attach the chain to a red and yellow anchor point to receive their next clue. Teams were then no longer Intersected.
At the Sleaford-Wanna Sand Dunes, one team member would be blindfolded and had to plant five coloured flags into their corresponding barrels while walking backwards in gumboots and directed through a walkie-talkie by their partner before retrieving their next clue.

Leg 13 (South Australia → Queensland)

Airdate: 28 February 2021
Port Lincoln (Port Lincoln Hotel) (Pit Start)
 Port Lincoln (Port Lincoln Airport) (via Adelaide) to Townsville, Queensland (Townsville Airport)
Townsville (Rowes Bay – BIG4 Beachfront Holiday Park) (Overnight Rest)
 Townsville (Castle Hill)
  Townsville (Jezzine Barracks to Lavarack Barracks)
 Ingham (Casa Pasta Restaurant) or Forrest Beach (Cassady's Boat Ramp)
Forrest Beach (Mungalla Station) 

In this leg's Roadblock, one team member, who did not perform Leg 4's Roadblock, had to abseil face-first  down Castle Hill and collect a dog tag beside their photo before receiving their next clue.

In this leg's first Detour, teams had to travel to Jezzine Barracks and find Captain Lily Charles. Teams then left for Lavarack Barracks in two groups of four 20 minutes apart, travelling by CH-47 Chinook helicopters in the order they arrived. Teams then had to initially perform the Detour selected at the Brains or Brawn board at Castle Hill. In Brains, teams had calculate the bearing and elevation of a gun turret so that a simulated artillery shot landed within  of their target to receive their next clue. In Brawn, teams had to complete a physically demanding obstacle course to receive their next clue.

This leg's second Detour was a choice between Lady and the Tramp or Eat Like a Champ. In Lady and the Tramp, teams had to slurp up  of spaghetti, starting from either end of the table and slurping to the middle without breaking or biting the spaghetti, to receive their clue from Chef Patrick. In Eat Like a Champ, teams had to crack and eat three cone shell snails whole to receive their next clue.

Additional task
Once in Townsville, teams had to find an Apollo campervan and drive to BIG4 Beachfront Holiday Park to sign up for a departure time in two-minute intervals starting at 5:00 a.m.

Additional note
The Stowaway Teams who entered after Leg 4 could freely choose who completed the Roadblock challenge and additionally faced the original Brains or Brawn board that teams encountered in Leg 4. The first Stowaway Team to arrive at the board could choose whether they wanted Brains or Brawn, leaving the other label for the remaining Stowaway Team.

Leg 14 (Queensland)

Airdate: 1 March 2021
 Townsville (Townsville Airport) to Sunshine Coast (Sunshine Coast Airport) (Pit Start) 
Coochin Creek (Wild Horse Mountain)
Mountain Creek (Fryer of Whitby) (Unaired)
 Eumundi (Templeton Ginger Farm)
 Montville (Clock Shop or Candy Addictions)
Wootha (Maleny Botanic Gardens and Bird World) 

In this leg's Roadblock, one team member had pick, clean and sort a  plot of ginger to receive their next clue from Bundaberg Brewed Drinks founder Cliff Fleming.

This leg's Detour was a choice between Cuckoo or Candy. In Cuckoo, teams had to search among hundreds of cuckoo clocks for one marked with a German flag. In Candy, teams had to stretch, roll and hand-shape four lollipops.

Additional task
After arriving in Sunshine Coast, teams found an Intersection outside the airport. After pairing up, one member from each of the teams would be stranded in the Glass House Mountains and had to find the highest point to find a phone that they would use to describe their location to their partners. The searchers then had find the location on a topographical map before flying to their partners on the Land Rover LifeFlight Special Mission helicopter to receive their next clue. Teams were then no longer Intersected.

Additional notes
During the Pit Stop, all teams flew from Townsville to Sunshine Coast and began the fourteenth leg at Sunshine Coast Airport.
After the Detour, teams would find a tablet computer provided by Telstra with a message from their loved ones, who would tell them the location of the Pit Stop.

Leg 15 (Queensland)

Airdate: 2 March 2021
Palmwoods (Rick's Garage) (Pit Start)
Brisbane (South Brisbane – Musgrave Park) 
 Brisbane (South Brisbane – Musgrave Park or The Greek Club)
Brisbane (City Centre – Subway Queen Street)
Brisbane (Spring Hill – Wickham Park) (Unaired)
Brisbane (City Centre – Ibis Styles)
Brisbane (City Centre – Story Bridge) 

This leg's Detour was a choice between Cheery or Paniyiri. In Cheery, teams had to join the Brisbane All-Star Cheerleading club to learn and perform a routine to the satisfaction of the head coach to receive their next clue. In Paniyiri, teams had to learn and perform a traditional Greek dance to the satisfaction of the Paniyiri Greek Festival's judge to receive their next clue.

Additional tasks
At Rick's Garage, teams had to find a driver of a classic car, denoted by an Amazing Race flag on the back of their hat, to drive them to Brisbane. 
At Subway, one team member was blindfolded and had to eat a sandwich made by their team member. The blindfolded teammate had to correctly guess all ten ingredients in the sandwich before receiving their next clue.
After the Subway task, teams had to find an Orange Sky Laundry mobile laundry in Wickham Park. Once there, teams had to wash clothes for the homeless to receive their next clue. This task went unaired in the episode but was shown as an extra scene on the show's website.
At the Ibis Styles hotel, teams had use a series of keycards and a grid to unlock 14 allocated hotel rooms and turn on the lights to receive their next clue from the concierge. Collectively the lit up rooms would create an image of a smiley emoji when the building was viewed from the exterior. Teams were prohibited from using the hotel elevator after they had initially reached the top floor.

Leg 16 (Queensland → Tasmania)

Airdate: 7 March 2021
Brisbane (City Centre – Queens Gardens) (Pit Start)
 Brisbane (Brisbane Airport) to Hobart, Tasmania  (Hobart Airport)
Hobart (Sandy Bay – Wrest Point Hotel Casino)
 Hobart (Sandy Bay – Long Beach)
 Taroona (Shot Tower)
 Cambridge (Coal River Farm) or Bridgewater (Tasmanian Cask Company)
 Hobart (Battery Point – Purdon & Featherstone Reserve) to River Derwent (Lady Nelson) 

This season's only Fast Forward was a recreation of the annual Dark Mofo winter solstice nude swim at Long Beach. The first team to strip nude and swim to a floating pontoon in the River Derwent would win the Fast Forward award.

This leg's Detour was a choice between Sweets or Spirits. In Sweets, teams had to lick a giant piece of white chocolate art until they could reveal the location of their next clue: Chilli the goat's farmhouse. In Spirits, teams had to rebuild a  whisky barrel from scratch to receive their next clue from the cooper.

Additional tasks
At the Wrest Point Hotel Casino, teams had to dress in 1970's attire (referring to the era when the Wrest Point opened as Australia's first legal casino) and build a five-storey house of cards using all of the provided cards to receive their next clue.
After the house of cards task, teams would be strapped onto bosun's chairs and had to abseil from the roof of the casino's 19-storey tower and wash three floors of windows on their way down to receive their next clue.
From Purdon & Featherstone Reserve, teams had to kayak to the Pit Stop on Lady Nelson.

Leg 17 (Tasmania)

Airdate: 9 March 2021
Southwest National Park (Lake Pedder) (Pit Start)
Southwest National Park (Gordon Dam)
 Southwest National Park (Rainforest) (Unaired)
 Westerway (Westerway Raspberry Farm)
New Norfolk (Bush Inn)  
New Norfolk (Willow Court Asylum) 

There was a Roadblock on this leg, but it was unaired. A red Roadblock clue is briefly visible in Amanda's hand as they leave the Gordon Dam, and teams are shown reading their Detour information in an unknown location deep in a rainforest.

This leg's Detour was a choice between Crush or Crunch. In Crunch, one team member had to get into a tub of near freezing water and work with their partner to find one apple out of a hundred with a dyed black core without using their hands to receive their next clue.

Additional tasks
At the Gordon Dam, teams had to shoot a basketball from the top of the  dam into a giant oversized net to receive their next clue.
At the Bush Inn, teams encountered an Intersection. After pairing up, teams had to shuck and eat 100 Tasmanian oysters to receive their next clue. Teams were then no longer Intersected.
At the Willow Court Asylum, teams had to use a map to navigate the dark and haunted buildings to find the Pit Stop.

Leg 18 (Tasmania)

Airdate: 14 March 2021
Hobart (Sandy Bay – Wrest Point Hotel Casino) (Pit Start)
Ross (Ross Uniting Church and Ross Bridge)
 Mole Creek (Trowunna Wildlife Sanctuary)
 Elizabeth Town (Ashgrove Cheese Farm) 
Launceston (Cataract Gorge – Duck Reach Power Station) 

In this leg's Roadblock, one team member had to enter a Tasmanian devil enclosure to search for their next clue, hidden in a bag hanging from a tree, while dragging a piece of meat behind them along a set route.

This leg's Detour was a choice between Small Cows or Big Cheese. In Small Cows, teams had to search multiple pens to find four calves with black dots marked on their ear tags to receive their next clue. In Big Cheese, teams had to successfully estimate and cut  of cheese and carry it up a hill to be weighed and receive their next clue.

Additional task
In the town of Ross, teams had to carry ten  sandstone bricks, up to two at a time, from the Ross Uniting Church to the Ross Bridge, while shackled and dressed as convicts, to receive their next clue.

Leg 19 (Tasmania → New South Wales)

Airdate: 15 March 2021
Launceston (Riverbend Park) (Pit Start)
 Launceston (Launceston Airport) to Sydney, New South Wales (Sydney Airport)
 Sydney (Mascot – Domestic Airport Railway Station) to Newcastle (Hamilton Railway Station)
Newcastle (Newcastle Steelworks)
Cessnock (Byalee Stables) (Overnight Rest)
 Pokolbin (Tintilla Estate Winery or RidgeView Estate Winery)
Pokolbin (Pokolbin Farm Stay)
Pokolbin (Hunter Valley Gardens) 

This leg's Detour was a choice between Pit or Paddle. In Pit, teams had to cleanly remove the pits from 200 olives, using only their hands, to receive their next clue. In Paddle, teams had to paddle across a lake on wine barrels to a swim ring, collect grapes and squeeze  of grape juice into a wine glass to receive their next clue.

Additional tasks
At the Hamilton Railway Station, teams had to find the station master who had their next clue.
At the Newcastle Steelworks, teams had to learn and perform a tap dance routine with the Tap Dogs to the satisfaction of Dein Perry to receive their next clue.
At Byalee Stables, teams had to complete a synchronised dressage event called pas de deux on hobby horses to the satisfaction of dressage coach Ann-Maree Lourey to receive their next clue.
At Pokolbin Farm Stay, teams had to unroll a hay bale and find a needle to receive their next clue from a farmer.

Leg 20 (New South Wales)
 
Airdate: 16 March 2021
Blue Mountains National Park (Echo Point Lookout overlooking the Three Sisters) (Pit Start)
 Blue Mountains National Park (Empress Canyon)
 Medlow Bath (Hydro Majestic Hotel – The Wintergarden Restaurant or Belgravia Lawn)
Katoomba (Carrington Town Square)
 Blackheath (Mount Boyce – Skybridge)
Leura (Leuralla Toy and Railway Museum)
Leura (Leuralla Amphitheatre) 

In this leg's first Roadblock, one team member had to follow a guide through the wild terrain of the Empress Canyon before abseiling down the  Empress Falls to receive their next clue.

This leg's Detour was a choice between Lunch or Launch. In Lunch, teams had to take an order of eight items at a high tea and serve the correct food to receive their next clue. In Launch, team members had to dress up as Bunyip Bluegum and Bill Barnacle. One team member had to launch chocolate puddings from a slingshot, and the other team member had to catch five puddings in their hats in a row to receive their next clue from Albert the Magic Pudding.

Additional task
At Carrington Town Square, teams had to learn and perform a hula hoop circus routine to the satisfaction of international circus performer Tahmour Bloomfield to receive their next clue.

Leg 21 (New South Wales)

Airdate: 21 March 2021
 Sydney (Sydney Airport) to Dubbo (Dubbo City Regional Airport)
Dubbo (Old Dubbo Gaol)
 Kickabil (Wheat Farm)
Gulgong (Prince of Wales Opera House)
 Tooraweenah (Emu Logic)  

In this leg's Roadblock, one team member had to drive a tractor alongside a combine harvester to collect wheat then deposit it into a silo bag to receive their next clue. If racers spilled any wheat at any point, they would have to go to the back of the queue.

This leg's Detour was a choice between Crack or Corral. In Crack, each team member had to crack and eat a series of four fresh raw eggs of varying sizes – quail eggs, chicken eggs, duck eggs and emu eggs – to receive their next clue. In Corral, teams had to attract and herd ten emus into a pen using a prop to receive their next clue.

Additional tasks
At the Old Dubbo Gaol, teams had to escape from a cell and climb a rope ladder over a wall without being spotted by one of the guards, who could only look straight ahead, to retrieve their next clue.
At the Prince of Wales Opera House, teams had to learn and perform the 19th century song "Home! Sweet Home!" on stage, while in period costume in a tribute to Dame Nellie Melba, to receive their next clue.

Additional notes
Teams were released from Dubbo City Regional Airport in the order they finished the previous leg.
In an unaired task, one team member had to enter a dunny and stay seated until a song finished while being in close encounter with spiders. This task was not shown in the episode but was posted as an extra scene on the show's website.

Leg 22 (New South Wales)

Airdate: 22 March 2021
Dubbo (Dubbo Square) (Pit Start)
 Dubbo (Dubbo City Regional Airport) to Broken Hill (Broken Hill Airport)
Broken Hill (Palace Hotel – Big Heel)
Broken Hill (Intersections of Sulphide and Blende Streets, Cobalt and Chloride Streets, Cobalt and Sulphide Streets and Bromine and Cobalt Streets)
Broken Hill (Big Ant)
 Broken Hill (Junction Mine)
Silverton (John Dynon Art Gallery)
Silverton (Silverton Hotel)
Silverton (Mad Max Museum) 

In this leg's Roadblock, one team member had to fill a barrel at the end of a seesaw with grit so that it balanced the weight of their partner, who sat on the other end, to receive their next clue.

Additional tasks
In Broken Hill, teams had to follow clues to find four street intersections featuring names of different elements or compounds. At each intersection, teams had to collect equipment and chemicals – including potassium iodide, hydrogen peroxide and coloured detergent – for an elephant's toothpaste experiment. Once collected, teams performed the experiment at the Big Ant before receiving their next clue from a mad scientist.
At the John Dynon Art Gallery, teams had to correctly count the number of wheels, which had to have spokes and a rim, on the pushbikes and tricycles mounted on the exterior and in the surrounding marked areas of the gallery (107) to receive their next clue from artist John Dynon.
At the Silverton Hotel, teams had to scull two shoeys from a women's high-heel boot, made of a blended concoction of the pub's menu items, before receiving their next clue from Australian drag queen Shelita Buffet.

Leg 23 (New South Wales)

Airdate: 23 March 2021
Broken Hill (BHP Mine) (Pit Start)
 Broken Hill (Broken Hill Airport) to Sydney (Sydney Airport)
 Sydney (Mascot – Domestic Airport Railway Station to Kingsgrove – Kingsgrove Railway Station)
Sydney (Kingsgrove – Garlo's Pies)
Sydney (Canley Heights – Diem Hen Restaurant)
 Sydney (Bonnyrigg – MingYue Lay Temple)
Sydney (Redfern – National Centre of Indigenous Excellence)
 Sydney (St Peters – Sydney Trapeze School)
Sydney (Waverton – Berrys Bay Lookout) 

This season's final Detour was a choice between Fan or Find. In Fan, teams had to learn and perform a Han dynasty-era fan dance in the temple's courtyard to receive their next clue. In Find, teams had to shake the fortune sticks in the temple's main hall until one fell out. They then had to find the golden box that correlated with the stick's number and contained their next clue.

In this leg's Roadblock, one team member had to perform a Marvel Cinematic Universe-inspired stunt by jumping over a flame bar and free-falling  to receive their next clue.

Additional tasks
At Garlo's Pies, teams had to roll, fill and bake 24 meat pies to the satisfaction of general manager Jackson Garlick to receive their next clue.
At Diem Hen Restaurant, teams had to play lazy Susan roulette and eat six hột vịt lộn, fertilised duck eggs which were either 21 or 28 days old, to receive their next clue and Bundaberg Brewed Drinks.
At the National Centre of Indigenous Excellence, teams had to write and perform a rap song about their time on The Amazing Race Australia based on Aboriginal rapper Majeda Beatty's style to receive their next clue.

Additional note
At the Pit Stop, teams slept in a suspended bed overhanging the edge of a cliff face.

Leg 24 (New South Wales → Australian Capital Territory → New South Wales)

Airdate: 28 March 2021
Sydney (Waverton – Carradah Park) (Pit Start)
 Sydney (Sydney Airport) to Canberra, Australian Capital Territory (Canberra Airport)
 Canberra (Lake Burley Griffin)
Canberra (Parliament House)
Canberra (Old Parliament House) (Unaired)
  Canberra (Canberra Airport) to Thredbo, New South Wales (Thredbo River)
 Thredbo (Mount Kosciuszko – Friday Flat)
 Thredbo (Mount Kosciuszko – Eagles Nest)
Kosciuszko National Park (Mount Kosciuszko Summit) 

In this leg's first Roadblock, one team member had to ride a Fliteboard for 10 seconds while wearing court dress to receive their next clue.

In this season's final Roadblock, both team members had to fly via helicopter to Thredbo. Once there, the team member who did not perform the previous Roadblock had to board a stunt helicopter, climb down a rope ladder to retrieve their next clue, jump into the water and swim to shore to reunite with their partner.

Additional tasks
On the front lawns of New Parliament House, teams had to correctly assemble two giant  flag puzzles of the flag of Australia and Australian Aboriginal Flag using fabric strips to receive their next clue from Australian Capital Territory Legislative Assembly politician Tara Cheyne.
Inside Old Parliament House, one team member had to stand in the House of Representatives gallery and memorise an excerpt of the "Kerr's cur" speech, made by former Prime Minister Gough Whitlam, without any notes. They then had to dictate the excerpt to their partner, who had to use a typewriter to type out the excerpt word perfect. Once approved, one team member had to proceed to the front steps to deliver the lines and receive their next clue. This task went unaired in the episode.
From the second Roadblock, teams had to take the gondola to a giant  slip and slide at Friday Flat, which they had to ride down while collecting six coloured flags to receive their next clue.
At Eagles Nest, teams had to match weird laws with the correct state or territory that they're from, collecting puzzle pieces from the eliminated teams for each correct answer. Once all puzzle pieces were collected, teams had to assemble the puzzle of an Aboriginal Australian group map to receive their final clue.

Reception

Ratings
Ratings data is from OzTAM and represents the viewership from the 5 largest Australian metropolitan centres (Sydney, Melbourne, Brisbane, Perth and Adelaide).

Critical response
The twist to introduce two new "stowaway" intruder teams was not received well by many viewers of the show. In response to the criticism of the stowaway twist, Beverley McGarvey stated, "In an ideal world, would we have done things a little bit differently? Absolutely."

Notes

References

External links

Australia 5
2021 Australian television seasons
Television productions postponed due to the COVID-19 pandemic
Television shows filmed in Australia